Pleurodontidae is a family of air-breathing land snails, terrestrial pulmonate gastropod mollusks in the superfamily Helicoidea. 

This family is classified within the order Stylommatophora within the superorder Eupulmonata (according to the taxonomy of the Gastropoda by Bouchet & Rocroi, 2005). This family has no subfamilies.

The family Pleurodontidae includes some American taxa that used to be included within the Australasian family Camaenidae, a taxon whose monophyly was in doubt.

Anatomy
Pleurodontids are defined by a missing diverticulum. However the diverticulum is partially present in the genus Solaropsis. The stimulatory organ is equally missing. However, Solaropsis has in part a penial stimulator and a divided penis retractor muscle.

Genera
Genera within this family include:
 Coloniconcha Pilsbry, 1933 - with the only species Coloniconcha prima Pilsbry, 1933
 Dentellaria Schumacher, 1817 - either separate genus (with a synonym: Lucerna) or as a synonym of Pleurodonte
 Discolepis Ancey, 1904
 Eurycratera Beck, 1837
 Eurycratera jamaicensis (Gmelin, 1791)
 † Ganeselloides Yen, 1969 
 Gonostomopsis Pilsbry, 1889
 Lucerna Swainson, 1840
 Pleurodonte Fischer de Waldheim, 1807
 Psadara Miller, 1878 - synonym or subgenus of Solaropsis
 Solaropsis Beck, 1837
 Thelidomus Swainson, 1840 (or in Camaenidae)
 Zachrysia Pilsbry, 1926 (or in Camaenidae)

References

External links

 Hartmut Nordsieck, Higher  classification  of  Helicoidea  and  the  molecular  analyses  of  their phylogeny

 
Gastropod families
Taxa named by Hermann von Ihering